Barri al-Gharbi  is a Syrian village located in Barri Sharqi Subdistrict in Salamiyah District, Hama.  According to the Syria Central Bureau of Statistics (CBS), Barri al-Gharbi had a population of 627 in the 2004 census.

References 

Populated places in Salamiyah District